Ghari may refer to one of the following

Ghari language
Ghari Bridge
Ghari village, Mansehra District, Pakistan
 Ghari (sweet)

See also
 Gari (disambiguation)
 Garre
 Garry (disambiguation)
 Gharry